Hypena tristalis is a moth in the family Erebidae. It is found in the Russian Far East, Korea, Japan and Taiwan.

The wingspan is 33–40 mm.

References

Moths described in 1853
tristalis
Moths of Japan